Nicholas Anthony Lassa, (July 11, 1898 – September 4, 1964) more popularly referred to as Long Time Sleep, was a professional American football player from the Flathead Indian Reservation in Montana.

Biography
Born on July 11, 1898, Lassa was Native American and a member of the Pend d'Orielle tribe, one of three members of the confederated tribes of the Flathead reservation in Montana. He was given the name, Long Time Sleep, by his teammates because he was difficult to wake up in the morning. 

Lassa attended and played college football at the Carlisle Indian School and Haskell Indian Nations University. Lassa eventually played in the National Football League in 1922 with the Oorang Indians.

The Oorang Indians were an all-Native American football team based in La Rue, Ohio and formed by Walter Lingo in 1922 to help promote his Airedale kennel. The team was organized by Jim Thorpe, who served the team as a player-coach. When the team formed, Lassa was the first player to arrive in La Rue.

Aside from football, Lassa enjoyed wrestling. He would make up to $50.00 for wrestling matches throughout the area. In fact he is most remembered for wrestling a bear as part of a halftime show of one of the Indians' games. Lassa would usually win between 10–20 dollars per match and that money would allow the whole team to go out partying all night.

After the team folded in 1923, Lassa stayed near LaRue, earning his living as a professional wrestler and strongman. He also stayed on working for Lingo and several of the other farmers in the area. He finally left the area in the early 1930s. He reportedly gave up drinking, raised a family, and became a respected member of his community. Lassa died on September 4, 1964.

References

1898 births
1964 deaths
Carlisle Indians football players
Haskell Indian Nations Fighting Indians football players
Oorang Indians players
American male professional wrestlers
Players of American football from Montana
Professional wrestlers from Montana
Haskell Indian Nations University alumni
Native American professional wrestlers
Native American players of American football
People from LaRue, Ohio
Blackfoot people